Welthauptstadt Germania or World Capital Germania was the projected renewal of the German capital Berlin during the Nazi period, part of Adolf Hitler's vision for the future of Nazi Germany after the planned victory in World War II. It was to be the capital of his planned "Greater Germanic Reich". Albert Speer, the "first architect of the Third Reich", produced many of the plans for the rebuilt city in his capacity as overseer of the project, only a small portion of which was realized between the years 1938 and 1943.

Some of the projects were completed, such as the creation of a great East–West city axis, which included broadening Charlottenburger Chaussee (today Straße des 17. Juni) and placing the Berlin Victory Column in the centre, far away from the Reichstag, where it originally stood. Other projects, however, such as the creation of the "People's Hall" (Volkshalle), had to be shelved owing to the beginning of war, although a great number of the old buildings in many of the planned construction areas were already demolished before the war. Ultimately war and defeat put an end to all plans.

Name
Adolf Hitler conceived of rebuilding Berlin to be the capital of the new world he would be instrumental in creating, and provided the name for it, 'Germania'. According to records of Hitler's "table talk" of 8 June 1942, Hitler's purpose in the renaming was to give a Greater Germanic world empire of the New Order a clear central point:

Hitler described his vision for the city several months earlier:

The official plan for rebuilding Berlin, with Albert Speer in charge, was called the "Comprehensive Construction Plan for the Reich Capital" (German: Gesamtbauplan für die Reichshauptstadt).

Planning
Doubts persisted at the time as to whether the marshy Berlin ground could have taken the load of the proposed projects, leading to the construction of an exploration building (Schwerbelastungskörper, literal translation: heavy load-bearing body), which still exists near the site where the Arch of Triumph would have been built. The Schwerbelastungskörper is an extremely heavy block of concrete used by the architects to test how much weight the ground was able to carry. Instruments monitored how far the block sank into the ground. Using the evidence gathered by these gargantuan devices, it is unlikely the soil could have supported such structures without further preparation. The plan was to cover the Schwerbelastungskörper by building a bridge over it. The arch would have been nearby, but problems with the axis running through infrastructure would have made it difficult to establish any convenient location.

Speer was reproved by Martin Bormann when he contacted Protestant and Catholic authorities, as, according to Bormann, churches were not to receive building sites in the new areas.

Demolition
The razing of old buildings to make way for the reconstruction of Berlin began in 1938 in various places around the city. This included the Alsen district, where the Great Hall would stand, and the Tiergarten district, where Speer planned to build the House for German Foreign Transport, and where the Kaiser-Wilhelm-Strasse would intersect with the great East-West Axis which was to be built.  The East-West Axis was completed in time for Hitler's 50th birthday celebration a year later, in 1939, when Speer ceremoniously presented it to Hitler with the words "My Führer.  I should like to report the completion of the east-west axis.  May the work speak for itself."

Built
Speer designed a new Chancellery, which included a vast hall designed to be twice as long as the Hall of Mirrors in the Palace of Versailles. Hitler wanted him to build a third, even larger Chancellery, although it was never begun. The second Chancellery was destroyed by the Soviet Army in 1945.

Swedish Bohus granite was imported to be used as building material in Germania.

Construction halted
At the beginning of World War II, with the German invasion of Poland in 1939, construction was suspended, but resumed after the clear German victory.  When France was defeated in 1940, Hitler visited Paris briefly with Speer and a few chosen others, the Führer's desire to "give Berlin a new face" was revitalized, and the work was redoubled at his command.  At Speer's instigation, Hitler signed a decree which read: 

In the shortest possible time Berlin must be redeveloped and acquire the form that is its due through the greatness of our victory as the capital of a powerful new empire. In the completion of what is now the country's most important architectural task I see the most significant contribution to our final victory.  I expect that it will be completed by the year 1950. [emphasis in the original]

After serious setbacks in the German invasion of the Soviet Union, which Hitler had initially seen as another blitzkrieg ("lightning war"), construction on "Germania" was halted permanently in March 1943.

Never constructed

Avenue of Splendors
Almost none of the other buildings planned for Berlin were ever built. Berlin was to be reorganised along a central  boulevard known as the Prachtallee ("Avenue/Boulevard of Splendor(s)"). This would run south from a crossroads with the East-West Axis close to the Brandenburg Gate, following the course of the old Siegesallee through the Tiergarten before continuing down to an area just west of Tempelhof Airport. This new North-South Axis would have served as a parade ground, and have been closed off to traffic. Vehicles would have instead been diverted into an underground highway running directly underneath the parade route; sections of this highway's tunnel structure were built, and still exist today. No work was ever begun above ground although Speer did relocate the Siegesallee to another part of the Tiergarten in 1938 in preparation for the avenue's construction.

The plan also called for the building of two new large railway stations as the planned North-South Axis would have severed the tracks leading to the old Anhalter and Potsdamer stations, forcing their closure. These new stations would be built on the city's main Hundekopf (dog's head) geography S-Bahn ring with the Nordbahnhof in Wedding and the larger Südbahnhof in Tempelhof-Schöneberg at the southern end of the avenue. The Anhalter Bahnhof, no longer used as a railway station, would have been turned into a swimming pool – in post-World War II Berlin.

Großer Platz
This square was to be surrounded by the grandest buildings of all, with the Führer's palace on the west side on the site of the former Kroll Opera House, the 1894 Reichstag Building on the east side and the third Reich Chancellery and high command of the German Army on the south side (on either side of the square's entrance from the Avenue of Splendours). On the north side of the plaza, straddling the River Spree, Speer planned to build the centrepiece of the new Berlin, an enormous domed building, the Volkshalle (people's hall), designed by Hitler himself. Had it been built, the Volkshalle would still be the largest enclosed space in the world today. Although war came before work could begin, all the necessary land was acquired, and the engineering plans were worked out.

Triumphal Arch
As a result of the occupation of Berlin by Soviet troops in 1945, a memorial was constructed with two thousand of the Soviet dead buried there in line with this proposed 'Triumphal Arch'. It had been intended that inside this generously proportioned structure the names of the 1,800,000 German dead of the First World War should be carved.

See also
 Fascist architecture
 Führer city – other cities in Germany and Austria planned for rebuilding
 Global city
 Nazi architecture
 Nordstern (city)
 Palace of the Soviets
 Speer und Er
 Stalinist architecture
 Totalitarian architecture
 Der Untergang
 Volkshalle – the Great Hall

References
Notes

Bibliography

Further reading

External links

 3D Virtual recreation
 Reuters report
 Erratik Institut Berlin, discussion of recurring elements of simulated architecture and simulacra in both the actual planning and media representation of Germania
 Hitler's Berlin. Project Germania
 Hitler's Supercity Documentary
 Welthauptstadt Germania
 Roger Moorhouse (March 2012) "Germania: Hitler's Dream Capital" History Today
 Visions of Alt-Berlin in "Man in the High Castle", Ezra Haber-Glenn, MIT Department of Urban Studies and Planning. About the recreation of an alternate Berlin in The Man in the High Castle TV series.
 How The Man in the High Castle Brought Hitler's Future Germany to Life, Katharine Trendacosta, Gizmodo.

1938 establishments in Germany
1943 disestablishments in Germany
1930s in Berlin
1940s in Berlin
Abandoned projects of Nazi Germany
Adolf Hitler
Albert Speer
Buildings and structures in Berlin
Cancelled cities
Cancelled projects in Germany
Nazi architecture
Planned capitals
Proposed populated places
Unbuilt buildings and structures in Germany